Mikko Kuningas (born 30 July 1997) is a Finnish professional footballer who plays as a midfielder or forward, most recently for USL Championship club Orange County SC.

Club career
Kuningas has played for PEPO Lappeenranta, Lahti, Lahti Akatemia and FC Inter Turku. Kuningas started his football career in Luumäen Pojat where he played his first junior years. Kuningas played same time in PEPO Lappeenranta and he did the debut in the first team of PEPO Lappeenranta in 2013.

Kuningas made the professional contract with FC Lahti in 2014. He made the debut in Veikkausliiga against FC Ilves on 19 July 2015 and he made the winning goal at the beginning of the second half.

In 2015, Kuningas visited Brazil to get acquainted with the activities of Fluminense FC. He was invited to European high-level tournaments Spax Cup in Germany and Terborg Tournament in Holland according to the Fluminense FC U19-team. The club management of the Fluminense FC wanted to hire him with a loan agreement from summer 2016. The transfer eventually failed with paperwork.

Kuningas signed a contract with FC Inter Turku for the season 2018. FC Inter Turku won the Finnish Cup in May 2018 against HJK Helsinki 0-1 (0-0). Kuningas scored the winning goal in the 82. minute. He had been substituted to the field a moment earlier.

In the season 2019 FC Inter Turku and Kuningas finished second place in Veikkausliiga.

On 18 December 2020, USL Championship club Orange County SC announced the signing of Kuningas.

International career
He has represented Finland at under-18 and under-19 youth level.

Honours 
Individual
 Newcomer of the Year: 2015

References

External links

1997 births
Living people
People from Luumäki
Finnish footballers
FC Lahti players
FC Kuusysi players
FC Inter Turku players
Orange County SC players
Kakkonen players
Veikkausliiga players
Association football forwards
Association football midfielders
Finnish expatriate footballers
Finnish expatriate sportspeople in the United States
Expatriate soccer players in the United States
Finland youth international footballers
Sportspeople from South Karelia